The 2019 Liga Profesional de Primera División season, also known as the Campeonato Uruguayo 2019, was the 116th season of Uruguay's top-flight football league, and the 89th in which it is professional. The season was named as "100 Años de Racing Club de Montevideo" and was originally scheduled to begin on 9 February but its start was pushed back for one week to 16 February. The season ended on 15 December with Nacional winning their forty-seventh title by beating Peñarol in the semifinal. Peñarol were the defending champions, having won back-to-back titles in 2017 and 2018.

Teams

El Tanque Sisley, who did not compete in the 2018 season, as well as the two bottom-placed teams in the relegation table of the 2018 season, Torque and Atenas, were relegated to the Segunda División for the 2019 season. They will be replaced by Cerro Largo, Juventud, and Plaza Colonia, who were promoted from the Segunda División.

Managerial changes

Torneo Apertura
The Torneo Apertura, named "Sr. Juan Lazaroff", was the first tournament of the 2019 season. It began on 16 February and ended on 5 June.

Standings

Results

Top goalscorers

Source: Soccerway

Torneo Intermedio
The Torneo Intermedio was the second tournament of the 2019 season, played between the Apertura and Clausura tournaments. It consisted of two groups whose composition depended on the final standings of the Torneo Apertura: teams in odd-numbered positions played in Serie A, and teams in even-numbered positions played in Serie B. It started on 13 July and concluded on 8 September, with the winners being granted a berth into the 2020 Copa Sudamericana and the 2020 Supercopa Uruguaya.

Serie A

Serie B

Torneo Intermedio Final

Top goalscorers

Source: Soccerway

Torneo Clausura
The Torneo Clausura, named "Sr. Franz Oppenheimer", was the third and last tournament of the 2019 season. It began on 14 September and ended on 11 December.

Standings

Results

Torneo Clausura decider
Since Nacional and Peñarol ended up tied in points for first place, an additional match was played by both teams to decide the Torneo Clausura winners. Nacional won this match and qualified for the semifinal.

Top goalscorers

Source: Soccerway

Aggregate table
The aggregate table includes the results of the three stages played throughout the season: Torneo Apertura, Torneo Intermedio, and Torneo Clausura. The top team at the end of the season will qualify for the finals of the championship playoff.

Championship play-off

Semi-final

Final
Since Nacional, who had the best record in the aggregate table, won the semi-final, they became champions automatically and the final was not played. Peñarol became runners-up as the second-placed team in the aggregate table. Both teams qualified for the 2020 Copa Libertadores group stage.

Relegation
Relegation is determined at the end of the season by computing an average of the number of points earned per game over the two most recent seasons: 2018 and 2019. The three teams with the lowest average were relegated to the Segunda División for the following season.

References

External links
Asociación Uruguaya de Fútbol - Campeonato Uruguayo 

2019
2019 in South American football leagues
2019 in Uruguayan football